Greengate Power Corporation (Greengate) is a Canadian energy company focused on renewable energy in Alberta. Greengate's focus in the past was in large, utility scale wind projects and has recently developed solar projects.

Summary of activity 

Greengate's first project, the 150 megawatt (MW) Halkirk I Wind Project, was completed in 2012. It supplies enough electricity to power approximately 50,000 homes. Unlike most other planned wind energy projects in Alberta, the project connected into Alberta's existing transmission system without any system upgrades while other developers wait for transmission upgrades. The company acquired all of the land needed to build the project, received approval from the Alberta Electric System Operator (AESO) to connect the project into the transmission grid, utilizing the existing transmission system without the need of major transmission upgrades. Once it was "shovel ready" the project was sold to Capital Power corporation.

Greengate's second project was the Blackspring Ridge I Wind Project, with a total generating capacity of 300 MW, upon completion in 2013, BSR was the largest wind farm in Canada and remains the largest in Alberta. Again Greengate brought this project through all the stages of development and then sold it shovel ready, this time to EDF EN Canada and Enbridge.

The California Public Utilities Commission approved three 20-year power purchase agreements (PPA) for a total of 450 MW in new wind energy generation between Pacific Gas and Electric Company (PG&E) and Greengate's Halkirk I Wind Project LP, Blackspring Ridge IA Wind Project LP and Blackspring Ridge IB Wind Project LP. The PPAs relate to the purchase and sale of renewable energy credits (RECs) generated by the 150 (MW) Halkirk I project and 300 MW Blackspring Ridge I Wind Project. This is the third-largest wind energy transaction ever executed by a California utility.

Greengate closed a $10.8 million private placement financing to be funded in two tranches, with the first raising gross proceeds of $5.8 million in September 2010 and the balance upon future milestones, which are likely to be achieved in March 2011.

References

Energy companies of Canada